"Figure It Out" is a song written by Mike Kerr and Ben Thatcher of British rock duo Royal Blood. The song was originally recorded by the duo for the band's eponymous debut studio album, Royal Blood, where it appears as the third track on the album. The track also appeared on the band's fourth single, released by Black Mammoth Records and Warner Bros. Records on 18 August 2014 as the lead single promoting Royal Blood.

Album artwork was designed from an original piece titled 'Deeps' by London-based artist Dan Hillier.

Track listing

Personnel
Partly adapted from Out of the Black liner notes.

Royal Blood
Mike Kerr – lead vocals, bass guitar
Ben Thatcher – drums

Technical personnel
Tom Dalgety – producer, recording
John Davis – mastering

Charts

Weekly charts

Year-end charts

Certifications

Release history

In popular culture
"Figure It Out" also appears on the soundtrack for the video game Pro Evolution Soccer 2016. The song also was used as the music in the trailer for the second series of the BBC One drama, Doctor Foster and for the Supernatural Season 10 trailer and the British Touring Car Championship 2014 season montage. The song was also used in season 1 episode 11 of the TV show Gotham.

It was also used as the opening track in the Entourage movie.

References

External links

 Royal Blood official website
 
 

2014 singles
2014 songs
Royal Blood (band) songs
Music videos directed by Ninian Doff
Song recordings produced by Tom Dalgety
Warner Records singles